"Small Fry" is a short story by Anton Chekhov originally published by Oskolki magazine on 25 (old style: 12) March 1885 (No. 12 issue), signed A. Chekhonte (А. Чехонте). It featured in all the 14 editions of Chekhov's 1886 collection Motley Stories (Пёстрые рассказы) which came out in Saint Petersburg in 1886, and was included by Chekhov into Volume 3 of his Collected Works, published by Adolf Marks in 1899–1901.

Synopsis
The petty clerk Nevyrazimov, sitting in his office on the Easter Eve in the company of a cockroach scurrying the table, muses upon what he might do to make it in the world (steal big money or perhaps report on somebody to the secret police) but comes to the conclusion that such deeds would be beyond his abilities. Disgusted with the feeling of his own unworthiness he takes it out on the cockroach and "feels better".

References

External links
 Мелюзга. Original Russian text
 Small Fry, Constance Garnett's 1918 translation. The Schoolmistress and Other Stories.

Short stories by Anton Chekhov
1885 short stories
Works originally published in Russian magazines